The Hundred of Petherick is a Hundred of the County of Cardwell (South Australia) centred on Petherick, South Australia. It is in the Limestone Coast region southeast of Adelaide.

References

Petherick

Limestone Coast